Cold cream is an emulsion of water and certain fats, usually including beeswax and various scent agents, designed to smooth skin and remove makeup. Cold cream is an emulsion of water in a larger amount of oil, unlike the oil in water emulsion of vanishing cream, so-called because it seems to disappear when applied on skin. The name "cold cream" derives from the cooling feeling that the cream leaves on the skin. Variations of the product have been used for nearly 2000 years.

Cold cream is mainly used for skin treatment (such as a facial mask or lip balm), due to its moisturizing properties. It can also be used to remove makeup and as shaving cream.

History 
The invention of cold cream is credited to Galen, a physician in second century Greece. The original formulation involved rose water, beeswax, and either almond or olive oil. The beeswax is essential to a successful cream, as it is the emulsifying ingredient, but it is extremely inefficient compared to modern emulsifiers. Creams made with only beeswax require extensive mixing and can separate upon standing. Thus, small quantities of borax were later added in addition to the beeswax. Borax saponifies fatty acids in the beeswax and allows for a more stable cream, using the small quantities of soap created as the emulsifying agent. 

This 1857 account relates:

A copy of the London Dispensatory, edited by Nicholas Culpeper and published in the year 1650 included the following formula for this substance:

An 1814 poem credited to "Dr. Russell" gives the following account of the benefits attributed to cold cream in that day:

When mixed with water, plant oils spoil rapidly, so cold cream was most often made in small batches at home or in local pharmacies.

Modern formulation 
Almost all modern cold creams have replaced the plant oils with mineral oil and have added alcohol, glycerin, and lanolin.  Beginning in the 1970s, jojoba oil became a common ingredient, used as a substitute of spermaceti from whales. Widely sold brands of cold cream in the United States include Pond's and Noxzema. 

Over the centuries, new uses have been found for the product: "As a toilet requisite cold cream is used for softening and cooling the skin after sunburn, as a cleansing cream, to relieve harshness of the skin, etc." 

Lush sells a cleanser, under the name Ultrabland, that most closely follows the original recipe attributed to Galen; it uses plant oils instead of mineral oils as the base of the cream.

See also
 Cream (pharmaceutical)

References 

Cosmetics